Irma Ratiani (born July 19, 1967) is a literary theoretician and translator, Doctor of Philological Sciences (2003), Professor (2004) at the Tbilisi State University (since 2006), Head of the Department of General and Comparative Literary Studies; Director of the research center - Shota Rustaveli Institute of Georgian Literature;  Editor in Chief of Annual Scientific Journal of Literry Theory and Comparative Literature published in Georgia - Sjani (Thoughts);Member of the EC of International Comparative Literature Association (ICLA).

Born in Tbilisi, Georgia, Irma Ratiani graduated from the Tbilisi State University (specialization Theory of Literature) in 1989. She received Candidate of Philological Sciences degree from Tbilisi State University in 1992, and Doctor of Philological Sciences (PhD) degree in 2003, at the same University.

From 2004-2006 she was a Head of the Department of Literary Theory at Shota Rustaveli Institute of Georgian Literature. From 2006 to present she is a director of Shota Rustaveli Institute of Georgian Literature. From 2006 to present she is a Head of the Department of General and Comparative Literary Studies at Tbilisi State University.
In 1997-1998 and 2002 she received JSPS Japan Society for the Promotion of Science Scholarship and she was working at the Faculty of Language and Culture, at Osaka University, Japan. In 2005 she received US State Department Scholarship, in the framework of University Partnership Program and was a visiting scholar at Central Asia-Caucasus Institute and Johns Hopkins University. In 2006 she received DAAD Scholarship and worked at the University of Saarland, in the Department of General and Comparative Literary Studies. In 2010 Irma Ratiani received Cambridge University scholarship. She is a multiplr receipient of Erasmus and Erasmus + scholarships for academics. 

The major field of the scientific interest includes: literary theory, general and comparative literary studies in a broad cultural context; analysis of various literary genres and directions, literary schools and formations in the frame of international cultural and literary processes, by using contemporary methodologies and approaches; revision and analysis of literary processes of Soviet and Post-Soviet period.

Author of several monographs, books, textbooks and more than 90 scientific articles; Editor of the books - Literature in Exile: Emigrants' Fiction, 20th Century Experience and Totalitarianism and Literary Discourse. 20th Century Experience" (published by Cambridge Scholars Publishing in 2016 and 2012, respectively). 
(https://www.amazon.com/Literature-Exile-Irma-Ratiani/dp/1443897108)
(https://www.amazon.com/Totalitarianism-Literary-Discourse-Century-Experience/dp/1443834459)

In 2008 she published “100 Verses from Old Japan”, translation with comments.

Other
President of Georgian Comparative Literature Association (GCLA) (http://geclaorg.ge/structure.htm)
Member of the EC of International Comparative Literature Association (ICLA) (https://web.archive.org/web/20131012025814/http://www.ailc-icla.org/site/)

Awards

2022 Awarded with the Golden Medal of Tbilisi State University for Academic Breakthrough

2019 Awarded with Saguramo Literary Prize for Literary Criticism
 
2013 Awarded with the Presidential Order of Excellence

2013 Awarded with the Taras Shevchenko Order of  Honor

2012 Awarded with Grigol Kiknadze Prize for the best monography

Bibliography
 Monographs
Antiutopian Mood, Liminality and Literature, 2020

Georgian Literature and World Literary Process, 2019

Text and Chronotope, 2010

Chronotope in Ilia Chavchavadze’s Fiction, 2006

Chronotope in the Anti-utopian Fiction. Interpretation of an Eschatological Anti-utopia, 2005

Published Scientific Books:

Introduction to Literary Studies, 2012

Fable and Plot, 2011

Genre Theory, 2009

Theory of Literature. The Basic Methodological Conceptions and Schools of  XX century, 2008

Published Text-books:

Traditions of European Drama and a New Georgian Theatre, 2012

Lectures in the Literary Theory. Theoretical Conception of Mikhail Bakhtin (theory of genre, dialogism, theory of chronotop); Anthropological Theoretical Conception (liminal theory of time and space), 2005

Lectures in the Literary Theory. Theory of Genre. Formation and development, 2005

Published Essayistic Book

Japanese Diaries, 2000, 2002

Published Translation with Comments

100 Verses from Old Japan, 2008

External links
European Network for Comparative Literary Studies page
Shota Rustaveli Institute of Georgian Literature
Georgian Comparative Literature Association

1967 births
Living people
Translators from Georgia (country)
Women writers from Georgia (country)
Women editors
Tbilisi State University alumni
Academic staff of Tbilisi State University